Grenada requires its residents to register their motor vehicles and display vehicle registration plates. Current plates are North American standard 6 × 12 inches (152 × 300 mm) but use Mandatory typeface developed for use on British plates. There are also some examples of plates using the size of standard British plates. Rear plates have yellow background and front ones white.

References

Grenada
Transport in Grenada
Grenada transport-related lists